Sypniewo  is a village in Maków County, Masovian Voivodeship, in east-central Poland. It is the seat of the gmina (administrative district) called Gmina Sypniewo.

The village has a population of 480.

References

Sypniewo